In enzymology, a protein-disulfide reductase (glutathione) is an enzyme that catalyzes the chemical reaction

2 glutathione + protein-disulfide  glutathione disulfide + protein-dithiol

Thus, the two substrates of this enzyme are glutathione and protein disulfide, whereas its two products are glutathione disulfide and protein dithiol.

This enzyme belongs to the family of oxidoreductases, specifically those acting on a sulfur group of donors with a disulfide as acceptor.  The systematic name of this enzyme class is glutathione:protein-disulfide oxidoreductase.  Other names in common use include glutathione-insulin transhydrogenase, insulin reductase, reductase, protein disulfide (glutathione), protein disulfide transhydrogenase, glutathione-protein disulfide oxidoreductase, protein disulfide reductase (glutathione), GSH-insulin transhydrogenase, protein-disulfide interchange enzyme, protein-disulfide isomerase/oxidoreductase, thiol:protein-disulfide oxidoreductase, and thiol-protein disulphide oxidoreductase.  This enzyme participates in glutathione metabolism.

Structural studies

As of late 2007, only one structure has been solved for this class of enzymes, with the PDB accession code .

References

 
 

EC 1.8.4
Enzymes of known structure